A list of collegiate chapters of the Pi Beta Phi sorority.

Chapters

I.C. Sorosis Chapters from prior to the name change

References
Pi Beta Phi Fraternity (2005) "Hearts that are Bound by the Wine & Silver Blue"  Harmony House Publishers, Prospect, Kentucky.

Notes 

Pi Beta Phi
chapters